Seth Bernard Lakeman (born 26 March 1977) is an English singer, songwriter and multi-instrumentalist, who is most often associated with the fiddle and tenor guitar, but also plays the viola and banjo. Nominated for the 2005 Mercury Music Prize, Lakeman has belonged to several musical ensembles, including one with his two brothers, fellow folk musicians Sam Lakeman and Sean Lakeman, but has most recently established himself as a solo act.

Career

The Lakeman Brothers
Seth Lakeman grew up with his two brothers, Sean Lakeman and Sam Lakeman, in the village of Buckland Monachorum in West Devon, England. He began playing music with his parents and brothers at an early age.

As The Lakeman Brothers, the three brothers released their debut album Three Piece Suite in 1994. Later that same year they were invited by two Yorkshire based singers Kathryn Roberts and Kate Rusby to join them as a backing group on a tour of Portugal. After the tour the five musicians became a permanent group and called themselves Equation. The group were signed in a record deal with Time Warner in 1995. After three full albums (Return to Me in 1996, Hazy Daze in 1998, and The Lucky Few in 2000), and tours in the UK, Europe and the United States, Lakeman left Equation in 2001. He joined his brother Sam and Sam's wife Cara Dillon and appeared on Dillon's eponymous debut album, which featured Lakeman on fiddle, guitar and vocals. The album won two awards at the 2002 BBC Radio 2 Folk Awards.

Solo work

In 2002 Lakeman released his first solo album, The Punch Bowl, produced by elder brother Sean Lakeman which received wide critical acclaim including a review in fRoots magazine which said: "The songs don't just glide smoothly by.....they get their claws into you".

Kitty Jay, Lakeman's second solo album was released in 2004. This was also produced by brother Sean Lakeman in his kitchen. The title track of the album tells the story of Jay's Grave, a well known location on Dartmoor. The album was recorded for a cost of less than £300. Kitty Jay reached silver status in the UK . That same year he collaborated with Devon singer-songwriter Steve Knightley and young local singer Jenna Witts on the album Western Approaches.

A UK tour in Autumn 2005 followed his Mercury Music Prize nomination, after which Lakeman and his band (regularly brother Sean Lakeman (guitar), Ben Nichols (bass), Andy Tween (drums)), toured extensively with folk-rock band The Levellers, who took to closing their set with a "fiddle off" between Lakeman and Levellers' fiddler Jonathan Sevink. Other support tours with Billy Bragg and Jools Holland brought Lakeman's music to a wider audience.

In March 2006 Lakeman began a UK tour to promote his new album Freedom Fields which was released on iScream. Produced again by Sean Lakeman, he signed to a new major record label, Relentless Records, promptly releasing a new single "Lady of the Sea" in early August 2006. This record went gold making it one of the biggest selling traditionally based folk records ever in the UK.

His fourth solo album, Poor Man's Heaven, was released on 30 June 2008 with an accompanying tour. It introduced a rockier edge to the folk of the previous albums. It was also the last album to be produced by Sean Lakeman and it was awarded silver levels of sales in the UK.

Lakeman's fifth album, Hearts & Minds, was released on 19 July 2010. Produced by studio veteran Tchad Blake Lakeman released his sixth album called Tales from the Barrel House on 18 November 2011. In 2014 the  Word Of Mouth album was released.

In 2018 Lakeman released another album, The Well Worn Path.
His most recent album, Make Your Mark, was released in 2021.

Music and Live Dates

2007 
In 2007, Lakeman performed at the SXSW festival in Texas, Hyde Park Calling, in London, the Glastonbury Festival, The V Festival in South Staffordshire, Womad Charlton Park Festival in Wiltshire, England, the Folk by the Oak Festival, the Edmonton Folk Music Festival, in Alberta, Canada, the Cornbury Music Festival, Fairport's Cropredy Convention, and the Towersey Village Festival (both in Oxfordshire). He also provided support for Tori Amos on her European tour.

2008 
On 18 April 2008, Lakeman appeared with Jethro Tull on their 40th anniversary tour at Colston Hall in Bristol before the start of his own UK tour later that month and going on to tour the festival circuit through the summer. His fourth album, Poor Man's Heaven was released on 30 June 2008.

In August 2008, Lakeman played at the Greenbelt Festival in Cheltenham, to over 18,000 people.

2009 
On 19 May 2009, Lakeman and his band played a concert at the famous cliff-side Minack Theatre in Porthcurno, Cornwall. A DVD, Seth Lakeman Live at the Minack was produced including 19 numbers.

The festival tour continued in 2009 (with new drummer Simon Lea), with an appearance at the Bath Fringe Festival on 3 June, playing at the newly renovated Komedia venue. On 29 June they played the Glastonbury Festival's Avalon stage.

In July, he played on the acoustic stage at Chagstock 2009, and was invited back next year to the main stage. In August, he performed at Cambridge Folk Festival for the second year running and again at the Cropredy Festival, Fairport Convention's annual folk festival in Oxfordshire, headlining on the Friday night. The band also headlined at The Levellers' Beautiful Days festival on Friday 21 August and at the V Festival in Weston Park the following day. The band, now augmented by Benji Kirkpatrick, performed on the Shrewsbury Folk Festival main stage on 29 August and then at Solfest, in Cumbria, England on Sunday 30 August.

On 13 September 2009, Lakeman performed at the Harvest at Jimmy's Food & Music Festival at Jimmy's Farm, Suffolk. Lakeman has also been a regular performer at the small annual Parklife Festival in the town of Tavistock not far from his home village of Buckland Monachorum.

2010 
Lakeman played at Cornbury Festival at Cornbury Park in Oxfordshire on Sunday 4 July, and as second headline on the main stage at Chagstock 2010 on Saturday 17 July. He also played at the 2010 Tall Ships Festival on 10 July in Hartlepool, and at the Cambridge Folk Festival, also in July.

He made a return local visit to the Levellers "Beautiful Days" festival on 21 August in Devon and played as support for Runrig on their German tour, some days later. He was also the main headline on Saturday 4 September at Weyfest in Farnham, Surrey.

2011 
Lakeman played on the opening night of the Eindhoven Folkswood Festival on 12 August.

2013 

Lakeman again played the Cornbury Festival, closing the festival on Sunday night. He also played the boutique Sark Folk Festival in July and played a sell-out performance at Gloucester Cathedral on 1 October.

2014 
Lakeman released his 7th studio album 'Word Of Mouth' which entered the charts at number 20. On 6 June, Seth played at the Royal Albert Hall in London as part of the Radio 2's D-Day 70 Years On concert, he performed King & Country with the BBC Concert Orchestra. He wrote the song, which appeared on his gold-selling album Freedom Fields, about his grandfather who took part in the D-Day landings and took him years later to Arromanches Beach to recount that fateful day

2015 
Lakeman recorded a special song for ITV's Midsomer Murders with Lucie Jones, The Ballad of Midsomer County. On 11 November, he was invited to perform at Armistice Day in Trafalgar Square, London.
He toured around the UK with the band and solo. He finished the year with a sold out show at Plymouth Pavilions (in his hometown) where his sister-in-law Cara Dillon was the special guest for the night.

2016 

Lakeman made a return to the Minack Theatre, Cornwall on 5 May 2016, almost exactly seven years after his last sell-out show at the venue. Ballads of the Broken Few was released on Cooking Vinyl and charted at number 19, his 8th studio album. He toured around the UK and played many festivals including Beautiful Days, Glastonbury Festival and Sidmouth Folk Week. In October he received an Honorary Degree from Plymouth Marjon University.

2017 
After a phone call from Robert Plant on New Year's Day, Lakeman went into the studio to record with him on Plant's Carry Fire album (released 3 October 2017) and was invited to go on tour with him in the UK as part of the band (the Sensational Space Shifters) and also as the support on all the shows.
He re-released the Top 20 album, Ballads of the Broken Few with added bonus tracks around his performance at BBC Radio 2's Festival in a Day at Hyde Park in September 2017.

2018 
He joined Robert and the band in the US and Australia, plus at a number of other dates in 2018. 

In June, he announced that he would be releasing his 9th new studio album The Well Worn Path on 26 October 2018 as well as a tour with the band in November 2018.

2019 
On 23 October Lakeman announced that he would be releasing his 10th studio album A Pilgrim's Tale in February 2020, the album telling the epic tale of the Pilgrim Fathers on the 400th anniversary of the historic Mayflower voyage. He also announced tour dates to coincide with the album release, 10 towns and cities associated with the voyage.

Awards 
In July 2005 Lakeman was nominated for the Mercury Music Prize for his album Kitty Jay.
On 5 February 2007 Lakeman won Singer of the Year and Best Album awards at the BBC Radio 2 Folk Awards.

Instruments 
Lakeman's primary musical instruments are the violin, the tenor guitar, the banjo and the viola.

Personal life 
Lakeman was married in 2012 to his longterm fiancée, Hannah Edwards, at Withiel, near Wadebridge in Cornwall. During the church service, the bride's 90-year-old grandfather, who is a Cornish bard, read a blessing in Cornish. The wedding was described by Lakeman's father, Geoff, as a "mini-festival". Among the wedding guests who also made performance contributions were Cara Dillon, Steve Potter, Steve Knightley, Cormac Byrne, Patsy Reid and Mad Dog Mcrea.

Discography

Singles 

"The Bold Knight" (2005)
"Lady of the Sea" (2006) #52
"The White Hare" (2006) #47
"King & Country" (2006)
"Poor Man's Heaven" (EP) (2007) #95
"The Hurlers" (2008)
"Crimson Dawn" (2008)
"Solomon Brown" (2008) about the Penlee lifeboat disaster
"Hearts & Minds" (2010)
"Tiny World" (2010)
"Stepping Over You" (2010)
"Blacksmiths Prayer" (2011)
"More Than Money" (2011)
"Portrait of My Wife" (2013)
"The Courier" (2014)
"Last Rider" (2014)

Albums

As main artist 
The Punch Bowl (2002, iScream)
Kitty Jay (2004, iScream) UK No. 100
Freedom Fields (2006, iScream) UK No. 32
Poor Man's Heaven (2008, Relentless) UK No. 8
Hearts & Minds (2010, Virgin) UK No. 17
Tales from the Barrel House (2011, Honour Oak) UK No. 63
Word of Mouth (2014, Honour Oak / Cooking Vinyl) UK No. 20
Ballads of the Broken Few (2016, Cooking Vinyl) UK No. 18
Ballads of the Broken Few with bonus tracks (2017, Cooking Vinyl)
The Well Worn Path (2018, Cooking Vinyl) UK No. 49
A Pilgrim's Tale (2020, Cooking Vinyl) UK No. 39
Make Your Mark (2021, Honour Oak)

With The Lakeman Brothers 
Three Piece Suite (1994)

With Equation 
Hazy Days (1998)
The Lucky Few (1999)
Dark Ages E.P. (2000)
First Name Terms (2002)
Return to Me (2003)

With Steve Knightley and Jenna Witts 
Western Approaches (2004)

With the Full English 
The Full English is a folk music digital archive project. Lakeman joined Fay Heild, Martin Simpson and others to create a Full English group to record folk songs for the archive, followed by a national tour. (Topic, 7 October 2013)

References

External links 

1977 births
British male violinists
English folk musicians
English folk singers
English male singer-songwriters
English violinists
Living people
People from Buckland Monachorum
Musicians from Devon
21st-century English singers
21st-century violinists
21st-century English male singers
Equation (band) members
The Lakeman Brothers members
The Full English members
Relentless Records artists
EMI Records artists
Virgin Records artists
Cooking Vinyl artists